Doliocarpus is a genus of flowering plants in the family Dilleniaceae, native to Central and South America.

Selected species
Species include:
Doliocarpus amazonicus Sleumer
Doliocarpus aracaensis Aymard
Doliocarpus areolatus Kubitzki
Doliocarpus aureobaccatus Aymard
Doliocarpus aureobaccus G.A. Aymard
Doliocarpus brevipedicellatus Garcke
Doliocarpus carnevaliorum Aymard
Doliocarpus chocoensis Aymard
Doliocarpus dasyanthus Kubitzki
Doliocarpus dentatus (Aubl.) Standl.
Doliocarpus dressleri Aymard
Doliocarpus elegans Eichler
Doliocarpus elliptifolius Kubitzki
Doliocarpus foreroi Aymard
Doliocarpus gentryi Aymard & J.Mill.
Doliocarpus glomeratus Eichler
Doliocarpus gracilis Kubitzki
Doliocarpus grandiflorus Eichler
Doliocarpus guianensis (Aubl.) Gilg
Doliocarpus herrerae Pérez Camacho
Doliocarpus hispidobaccatus Aymard
Doliocarpus hispidus Standl. & L.O.Williams
Doliocarpus humboldtianus Aymard
Doliocarpus kubitzkii Aymard
Doliocarpus lancifolius Kubitzki
Doliocarpus leiophyllus Kubitzki
Doliocarpus liesneri Aymard
Doliocarpus lombardii Aymard
Doliocarpus lopez-palacii Aymard
Doliocarpus macrocarpus Mart. ex Eichler
Doliocarpus magnificus Sleumer
Doliocarpus major J.F.Gmel.
Doliocarpus multiflorus Standl.
Doliocarpus nitidus (Triana) Triana & Planch.
Doliocarpus novogranatensis Kubitzki
Doliocarpus olivaceus Sprague & R.O.Williams ex G.E.Hunter
Doliocarpus ortegae Aymard
Doliocarpus paraensis Sleumer
Doliocarpus paucinervis Kubitzki
Doliocarpus pipolyi Aymard
Doliocarpus prancei Kubitzki
Doliocarpus pruskii Aymard
Doliocarpus sagolianus Kubitzki
Doliocarpus savannarum Sandwith
Doliocarpus schottianus Eichler
Doliocarpus schultesianus Aymard
Doliocarpus sellowianus Eichler
Doliocarpus sessiliflorus Mart.
Doliocarpus spatulifolius Kubitzki
Doliocarpus spraguei Cheesman
Doliocarpus subandinus Aymard
Doliocarpus triananus Aymard
Doliocarpus validus Kubitzki
Doliocarpus verruculosus Kubitzki

References

Dilleniaceae
Eudicot genera